Icons is the third studio album by None More Black, released on Fat Wreck Chords on October 26, 2010. It is the first album to feature new drummer Richard Minino.

Writing began in February 2009.

Track listing

References

2010 albums
None More Black albums
Fat Wreck Chords albums
Albums produced by Will Yip